Pairote Sokam (born August 24, 1987), is a Thai retired professional footballer who plays as a centre-back.

International career

In July 2013 Pairote debut for Thailand playing a friendly match against China.
Later in October 2013 Pairote was called up to the national team by Surachai Jaturapattarapong to the 2015 AFC Asian Cup qualification. In October, 2013 he came in as a substitute in a friendly match against Bahrain.

International

Honours

Club
Police United
 Thai Division 1 League 
  Champions (1) : 2015

References

External links
 Goal.com
 P. Sokam

1987 births
Living people
Pairote Sokam
Pairote Sokam
Association football central defenders
Pairote Sokam
Pairote Sokam
Pairote Sokam
Pairote Sokam
Pairote Sokam
Pairote Sokam
Pairote Sokam
Pairote Sokam